Flame Dragon Plus: Marks of Wind (炎龍騎士團 外傳: 風之紋章) is a tactical role-playing computer game published by Dynasty International Information, a Taiwanese company. It was released in 1998 and is the third game in the series. It is available only in Chinese.

While the second installment, Flame Dragon 2: Legend of Golden Castle (炎龍騎士團2: 黃金城之謎), gained some popularity in the English-speaking world, this title never gained the same interest due to less attractive graphics and less smooth interface. The mechanics of the game are almost identical to Flame Dragon 2.

1998 video games
DOS games
DOS-only games
Tactical role-playing video games
Fantasy video games
Video games developed in Taiwan